Brian Tse is the author of the Hong Kong children comic, "McMug and McDull" series. He is one of the two creators (another is Alice Mak, his colleague-turned-wife) of the cartoon characters McMug and McDull. His wife is responsible for the illustration. His other works include "The Excreman (屎撈人) " (a "serious" parody of the famous English cartoon, "The Snowman"), "The Beautiful Loser", "Pig Has Come", and "Over the Rainbow".

Childhood
Tse lived in a village in Sha Tin when he was small, and had a pet name, "Fook Chai", given by his neighbours. He was a lacklustre boy, and, according to his mother, he remained silent at all times even when his skin was being bit by ants. His family had to move from one location to other, thus Tse had changed his primary schools four times. Tse liked watching movies at cinemas; in order to earn money for buying tickets, he helped his classmates finish their art assignments as an odd-job. He had his secondary school life at St. Stephen's College, Stanley, where he built up his confidence. Then, he furthered his studies at the University of Sydney, majoring in Computer Science, Philosophy, and Education. He did not spend much time on his schoolwork, giving more of his attention to books in the library. While in Sydney, he became influenced by the cartooning style of Michael Leunig, a Melburnian who was (and remains to this day) one of the most popular and critically acclaimed cartoonists in Australia.

Writing career
Tse had his early works published on "Ming Pao Weekly". He gained his inspiration from the picture books he read in Australia, of which Raymond Briggs had the greatest influence on his creative writing. Tse was famous for his so-called adult fairy tales joining philosophy, Buddhist proverbs, songs, photos, and comics.
Tse's favourite pastimes include reading, listening music, and playing the piano.

See also
Alice Mak
McMug
McDull

References
"Every One Has a Dream", Breakthrough.

External links
 McMug and McDull Official Website

Hong Kong comics writers
Yellow Bus
Living people
Year of birth missing (living people)